Celeste is a 2018 platform game developed and published by indie studio Matt Makes Games. The player controls Madeline, a young woman with anxiety and depression who aims to climb Celeste Mountain. During her climb, she encounters several characters, including a personification of her self-doubt known as Badeline, who attempts to stop her from climbing the mountain.

Development of Celeste began in August 2015, when game developers Maddy Thorson and Noel Berry participated in a game jam, where they created Celeste for the PICO-8. Thorson, who served as producer, and Berry, who served as the lead programmer, wanted to expand the PICO-8 game into a full release. Inspired in part by Thorson's own TowerFall (2013) and Super Mario Bros. 3 (1988), the gameplay was designed to be minimal, while mirroring Thorson's experiences with bouldering. Celeste was designed to be accessible, featuring game mechanics intended to make the game more forgiving in addition to an "Assist Mode" offering several options to make the game less challenging. The themes of self-forgiveness present in the narrative began with the idea of creating a "more introspective" game, and later grew to become intertwined with the gameplay. The soundtrack was composed by Lena Raine.

Celeste released on January 25, 2018, for Linux, macOS, Nintendo Switch, PlayStation 4, and Windows, before being released on Xbox One the following day, and on Google Stadia in July 2020. Upon release, it received "universal acclaim" from critics, with multiple outlets describing it as one of the best video games of all time. Reviewers appreciated how narrative complimented its gameplay, and movement and controls were lauded as among the best in any video game. Critics appreciated its approach to difficulty and accessibility. Reviewers lauded the story as a whole as easy to relate to or "touching", and the depiction of depression and anxiety were praised. The pixel art style was praised as well, and its music was considered among the best video game soundtracks, with reviewers appreciating how it complemented the gameplay.

Since its release, Celeste has garnered a dedicated fandom and an active speedrunning community. On September 9, 2019, a free downloadable content (DLC) expansion named Farewell was released, introducing a new chapter to the game. The development team have stated that they do not intend to create a sequel for the main game, however a sequel to Celeste for PICO-8 titled Celeste 2: Lani's Trek was released in January 2021.

Gameplay

Celeste is a two-dimensional platform game. The player controls Madeline, who has the ability to run, jump, climb walls for a limited time, jump off walls, and dash in mid-air in one of eight directions. Certain objects grant Madeline additional abilities. Green gems refill her dash ability without the need to land on safe ground. Other objects including "dream blocks" that transport her from one side to another when dashed into, moving blocks that can transfer their momentum to Madeline when jumped off of, and bubbles that move when dashed into and platforms that only activate after Madeline dashes. The difficulty can be lowered through the use of an "Assist Mode", a setting that provides accessbility options including a lowered game speed, unlimited use of the dash ability, or the option to grant Madeline invincibility.

The base game is made up of eight chapters divided into multiple single-screen challenges, with checkpoints in between screens. Chapters contain branching paths leading to optional challenges and hidden collectibles. The collectibles range from strawberries and crystal hearts that unlock certain gates. Certain chapters contain a boss character. Each chapter has a "B-side" level that reuses mechanics from the main level to create a more difficult experience. B-side levels can be unlocked by locating the hidden cassette tape in its corresponding level. After completing all eight B-sides, "C-side" levels are unlocked, that are shorter in length but with increased difficulty. The Farewell expansion adds a new chapter that excludes B-side options and collectible strawberries, and adds grabbable jellyfish that function as a parachute and exploding pufferfish that can launch Madeline.

Plot

Celeste takes place on a fictionalized version of Celeste Mountain, which features several areas, including an abandoned city and resort, and is seemingly haunted, housing many strange occurrences. Madeline, a young woman who serves as the protagonist, spontaneously decides to climb Celeste Mountain to regain self-esteem, and stubbornly persists until she reaches the mountain's summit. Upon her arrival at the mountain's base, she meets an elderly woman called Granny, who warns her against climbing the mountain. After ignoring Granny, Madeline encounters an abandoned city, where she meets Theo, a social media-obsessed traveler from Seattle. In the next area, Madeline experiences a nightmare where she encounters a part of herself in a mirror, a personification of her anxiety and depression known as "Badeline", who chases her out of the area and goes on to cast doubt on Madeline's ability to successfully climb the mountain, arguing that her attempts to prevent Madeline from continuing will save her from climbing the mountain unprepared, and describes herself as the "pragmatic part" of Madeline.

Madeline then enters the Celestial Resort and meets Oshiro, a ghost who owns the resort and struggles to leave his past behind, instead living in denial. He attempts to persuade Madeline to stay in the resort and improve its poor condition. After she helps him clean up, Badeline appears and taunts Oshiro, saying that Madeline only helped him to fuel her own ego. Thinking Badeline's words were true, he becomes enraged and chases Madeline out of the resort. Madeline then navigates through a windy environment until meeting Theo at a gondola lift. Badeline halts the gondola during its movement, causing Madeline to have a panic attack, but she is calmed by Theo. The two arrive at an ancient temple, where Theo gets trapped within a crystal, and Madeline must escort him to safety. After a conversation with Theo, Madeline gains enough confidence to confront Badeline, and reveals her intention to abandon her. In retaliation, Badeline throws her down the mountain. After finding Granny, who suggests to her that she should seek resolution rather than abandonment, Madeline searches for Badeline and chases her, then apologizes. The two reconcile and vow to climb the mountain together. After reaching the summit, they enjoy a strawberry pie with Granny, Theo, and Oshiro.

About a year later, Madeline meets with Granny to explore the mountain's core. Later, the two develop a connection to each other. Mourning the death of Granny, Madeline visits her grave, where she identifies a bird as a reincarnation of Granny, deciding to pursue it through space in hopes of locating Granny. Badeline protests this idea and abandons her, however she later returns, attempting to warn Madeline that she is dreaming and urges her to wake up. Despite initially refusing, Madeline later concedes and instead decides to free the bird as a tribute to Granny. Madeline meets Granny in a cloud-filled area, and apologizes for not attending her funeral. After waking up, Madeline is seen speaking to Theo on a video call, who reveals that Granny was friends with his grandfather.

Development

Conception

The original version of Celeste was developed by Maddy Thorson and Noel Berry in August 2015 for the fantasy video game console PICO-8 during a game jam lasting four days.. Due to self-imposed restrictions and time limitations, Thorson and Berry wanted the game to be minimal with additional mechanics to add complexity, to which they felt idea of a character struggling to climb a mountain was fitting. The initial prototype was titled "Everest". They decided to approach the project as a single-player adventure from its initial conception with lessons from the development of Thorson's previous game, TowerFall (2013), carried over into the game. After the development of the PICO-8 version, retroactively titled Celeste Classic, the team wanted to expand the game with additional development time and fewer restrictions. Celeste Classic was added into Celeste as a hidden minigame. Celeste was produced by Thorson, and Berry served as the lead programmer. The development team underwent crunch during the last few months of development.

Gameplay and accessibility
Thorson and Berry cited multiple games as having influenced the gameplay of Celeste, including Donkey Kong Country 2 (1995), Metroid (1986), and Kero Blaster (2014). Super Mario Bros. 3 (1988) was singled out by Thorson as the game Celeste was most inspired by, particularly for its approach to problem-solving, and the game's level design was noted by Shacknews and Kill Screen to have been reminiscent of levels created by Thorson in Super Mario Maker (2015). Thorson wanted Madeline's moveset to be minimal while still emulating the feeling of bouldering, which inspired Madeline's limited stamina when climbing walls, and the importance of vertical space caused by the theme of climbing a mountain further shaped the stamina system.

Due to the gameplay requiring more precise control, the developers chose to not use a pre-existing physics engine, as opting for proprietary physics simulations allowed them to predetermine outcomes to certain situations, rather than rely on complex simulations of certain engines. The precise gameplay also influenced the art style, as the team felt that pixel art could more clearly convey mechanics such as hitboxes to the player, and was a style that the team was familiar with creating. As the team adjusted Madeline's attributes, levels were frequently redesigned to accommodate them.

During the design phase, the team wanted Celeste to feel difficult yet fair to the player. Levels or mechanics deemed difficult in the "wrong way" were modified or removed. The team prioritized matching the player's intent over requiring frame-perfect execution, though challenges later in the game require more precision. Several mechanics contribute to this, one example being "coyote time", which allows players to jump for a small moment after leaving the ground, named after Looney Tunes character Wile E. Coyote's ability to sometimes become suspended in midair, only falling once made aware of the situation. Additional mechanics include the ability to buffer the input for a jump before touching the ground, a mechanic that simulates rounded corners to prevent the player from colliding with a corner, and one that allows players to jump off of a wall while slightly in front of it rather than requiring direct contact. The mechanics were designed to allow Celeste to be either hardcore or forgiving, depending on the player's preference. The game was further designed to make more difficult challenges have a more clear solution.

Systems like strawberries, B-sides, and Assist mode were designed to allow the player to customize the difficulty of Celeste. Thorson said that the ability of Assist Mode to make the game less challenging served as a counterbalance to the optional content such as strawberries, which make it more challenging. The implementation of an accessbility option was decided on after observing public discourse surrounding Cuphead (2017) that originated after many players felt that the game was too difficult or unforgiving. This mode was initially titled "Cheat Mode", but Thorson found that the name was too judgemental, and decided on the name "Assist Mode" as an alternative. She said that the mode was added late into development, and Berry added that it took only "a couple of day's work" to develop, though balancing the game as a whole required extensive playtesting.

Story and themes
Thorson served as the writer for the story. At the beginning of development, the team had little direction for the story. The themes of Celeste took inspiration by Studio Ghibli films such as Spirited Away (2001), and the developers knew that they wanted it to be more introspective compared to the more extroverted nature of TowerFall. When developing Celeste, Thorson experienced a 'breaking point' where her depression and anxiety became too severe to be ignored, that then served as the inspiration for the story of Celeste. She decided to explore the ideas in a video game, however she found developing a narrative surrounding her experiences difficult, as her struggles were still ongoing throughout development. She also found that, as she was "in the process of discovering her queerness" during development, the story inadvertently had queer undertones. During the ending of Farewell, Madeline is seen with a transgender pride flag, and Thorson later confirmed that Madeline was a transgender woman, which she regarded as obvious in retrospect, as Madeline's gender identity was inadvertently reflective of her own. The large role of the story in Celeste surprised the developers, and they made the decision to delay Celeste in order to "do the story justice", properly connect it to the gameplay, and make Madeline's experiences in the narrative reflect the player's experiences during gameplay.

Thorson believed that, when making a game about anxiety and depression, the player should be treated in the same way one would treat themselves. This transformed Celeste into a game about remembering to take care of oneself, and recognizing that sometimes self-improvement is necessary to avoid hurting others. The development team did not consult mental health professionals when developing the game, and instead decided to write the story based purely on their own experiences, as they desired to tell a personal and relatable story rather than to represent mental illness as a whole. The team aimed to ensure serious issues were not trivialized within the story, and repeatedly changed the dialogue to ensure it matched the characters' place in the story as a whole.

The ending was undecided for most of the development. Thorson recalled that she initially knew she wanted Madeline to fall down the mountain and later finish climbing, but she did not know how to execute or frame it in the story as a whole. She decided to make it clear to the player that reaching the summit was not the end of Madeline's story, and that her depression and anxiety were not "magically better". She also wanted to emphasize that Madeline's initial approach to ridding herself of anxiety—forcing her 'other self' into submission—was incorrect and that she instead realized that she must learn to function alongside it.

Music

Lena Raine composed the majority of Celestes soundtrack, with additional composers providing remixes of Raine's score for most of the B-side levels. Raine's score informed the visual design for certain levels. Sound designer Kevin Regamey incorporated sound effects into the music to further match gameplay, after which Raine would contribute further "musical ambience".

Specific sounds in the music of Celeste were designed to match certain themes. According to Raine, "In The Mirror" was one of the strangest tracks she has composed. Its synthesizer-heavy sequences, noted by Raine to be reminiscent of Vangelis and Blade Runner (1982), were designed to match the "cosmic horrors" experienced by Madeline. In "Resurrections", she created an "othering" sound that transitioned from the more simple melodic progression of "First Steps", and an "etherial sound evocative of a space that didn't seem quite real", as the song would play during a lucid dream sequence. "In the Mirror" includes vocals performed by Raine as Madeline's internal dialogue, reversed due to the theming of mirrors. When developing the song, she wanted there to be a sound nearly unintelligible and spoken in the background. She decided to record herself in a dark closet, attempting to vocalize what she related to in Madeline's struggles. According to Raine, she tries to "inject some part" of herself into her musical projects.

Each character in Celeste is represented by their own instrument. Madeline is represented by a piano, Badeline is represnted by a synthesizer, Theo is represented by guitar, and Oshiro is represented by a "theremin-like" synthesizer. Granny is an exception, as, according to Raine, "she embodies the power of the mountain and is a fairly omnipresent figure". Badeline's theme, a motif that first appears in "Resurrections" and later reappears in several other tracks, is written entirely in minor key, in contrast to Madeline's, which is "primarily cheery" and only occasionally transitions into a minor key. In the song "Anxiety", Raine attempted to capture the feeling of a panic attack and made the piano theme representative of Madeline be "engulfed" by the synthesizer representative of Badeline.

Track listing

Farewell
The Farewell expansion began development following a long break after release, and was developed in conjugation with the team's next project Earthblade. Initially planned to be a self-contained collection of extremely difficult levels, the expansion later grew in scope, and a new narrative was added to make it feel whole. The narrative continues the story of the base game and reinforces that Madeline continues to struggle with the same problems. Farewell was released at no additional cost, though Thorson noted that it was only possible due to the financial success of Celeste. Raine returned to compose the soundtrack for Farewell.

Marketing and release
Celeste was announced in July 2016, and Thorson and Berry livestreamed themselves developing the game on Twitch. The next month, a demo of the game was made playable at PAX West's Indie Megabooth. Celeste was initially announced for release in 2017, as Thorson and Berry wanted it to release as a launch game for the then-upcoming Nintendo Switch in March 2017. By December 2016, its release window had been changed to "mid-2017". The next February, a full trailer was released, showcasing Celestes gameplay. In April 2017, the development team published the first post for an Instagram account written in-character as Theo. The series of images framed as Theo's selfies serve as a prelude to the events of Celeste, detailing Theo's backstory and journey to Celeste Mountain.

Celeste released on January 25, 2018, on the Nintendo Switch, PlayStation 4, Microsoft Windows, MacOS, and Linux, and it would be released on Xbox One the following day. On July 9, 2020, it was announced that the game would be releasing on the cloud gaming service Google Stadia. It was added to the collection of games included for free with Stadia Pro—a subscription-based version of Stadia—on September 29.

Madeline and Badeline appeared as crossover characters in the Nintendo Switch version of TowerFall, released on September 27, 2018. In October 2018, Scarlet Moon Records announced Prescriptions for Sleep: Celeste, an album of Celeste cover songs described by Nintendo Life as "lullaby-style renditions" of the game's soundtrack. Prescriptions for Sleep: Celeste features violin by Maiko, saxophone by Norihiko Hibino, and piano by AYAKI, with Raine serving as co-producer. An open pre-order window for a Celeste collector's edition produced by Limited Run Games began on January 1, 2019. On January 21, it was announced that the game's soundtrack would receive an album of piano covers by Trevor Alan Gomes, titled Celeste Piano Collections, a part of the Piano Collections series by Materia Collective, released on January 25. In July, Materia Collective purchased the publishing rights for the music, and the composers of the game's B-side music went without royalties for 17 months. For its fifth anniversary in January 2023, it was announced that a new Celeste collector's edition from Fangamer would release that June.

In December 2018, Thorson announced that additional downloadable content (DLC) levels for Celeste would be released in "early 2019". The final chapter of Celeste, Farewell, was released as free DLC on September 9, 2019, however the team noted that the Xbox One version would have a slight delay.

Sales
In 2018, Celeste sold over 500,000 units, with the Nintendo Switch version reportedly being the most popular. Prior to the release of Farewell, Thorson said that Celeste was "coming up on a million copies soon"—it had reached that number by March 2020. The soundtrack had been streamed over 4 million times on Spotify and purchased over 6,000 times by the end of 2018.

Reception

Critical response

Celeste was heavily praised by critics upon release. According to the review aggregate website Metacritic, Celeste received "universal acclaim" on consoles, and "generally favorable reviews" on PC. Reviewers praised the game, with many describing it as "magnificent", "excellent", or "special", and IGN called it a "surprise masterpiece". It was considered by Hardcore Gamer to be among the best games of 2018, and Ars Technica called it "the most intense, memorable, and satisfying platformer" of the 2010s. Celeste was further described as "memorable" by GameSpot, and many reviewers found that it was a game they'd recommend to everyone. Reviewers appreciated how the game blended narrative and gameplay, and Eurogamer saying that "everything in Celeste speaks of care and attention". Game Informer said that Celeste was "easy to love and hard to put down", while Rock Paper Shotgun said they "enjoyed every minute" of Celeste.

The gameplay of Celeste received praise. Many reviewers felt that its controls and movement was among the best they've experienced, or otherwise lauded it as "smooth". Polygon felt that the game's movement was "firm and consistent", saying that they felt "in complete control" while playing. The variety and implementation of the game mechanics was praised, despite PC Gamer lamenting the addition of strong winds as a "huge momentum killer". On the contrary, Hardcore Gamer said that the "genius" of Celeste came "from simplicity". In-game collectibles were generally praised—Nintendo Life said that collecting them felt "very gratifying", while Game Informer disliked how the effort spent collecting them "felt futile" due to a lack of significant extrinsic motivation to do so. Paste felt that Thorson "has mastered level design as an unambiguous challenge" with Celeste, saying that the game effectively communicated its goals to the player, and that the challenge instead came from execution.

Celestes approach to difficulty was lauded by critics. The difficulty was likened by Polygon to games in the masocore genre, and many compared Celeste to Super Meat Boy (2010), as both games have a high level of difficulty. Many felt that the responsibility of failure felt as though it was always their own, and that successes felt immensely rewarding—Game Informer said that these successes "always overshadowed the bumps along the way", and Kotaku said that failure became "easier to accept" over time. Shacknews disliked the game's boss sequences, citing how a death to an enemy rather than the environment felt "irksome". PC Gamer said that Celeste "wields difficulty in a meaningful way", and Push Square and Hardcore Gamer both described the game's difficulty as a "true" test of the player's skill. The inclusion of Assist Mode was praised. Nintendo Life praised its implementation, customizability, and unintrusiveness, and Hardcore Gamer found that it was an "innovative way to make the game truly accessible to everyone". Rock Paper Shotgun said that Assist Mode solved the problem of difficulty "so elegantly that everyone should be paying attention".

Reviewers praised Celestes plot. The game's setting was described by Nintendo Life as "vibrant and fantastical", and some considered Celeste Mountain to be a metaphor for the difficulty of life. Hardcore Gamer said that the characters of Celeste were a "terrific, memorable lot", and reviewers further described them as "lovable", or easy to relate to—USgamer felt that they had "connected with Madeline alot" by the end of Celeste, and Nintendo Life said that she had a "warmth and sincerity" to her. Polygon described Theo as a "lighthearted, constant foil" to Badeline, the dialogue overall was praised, with Hardcore Gamer saying that it helped to "flesh out" the characters, and VideoGamer.com appreciated how it further contributed to the narrative being relatable. The story was considered by critics to be "heartfelt", "touching", or "heartwarming", and some felt that it was a 'timely' narrative, meanwhile others found it to be occasionally inspirational. Reviewers appreciated how the story was reflective of its gameplay, though Paste said that the execution of an interconnected gameplay and narrative was "a little awkward", saying that "Celeste definitely works better as a game than as a thought-provoking exploration of mental illness", despite them otherwise appreciating the game's depiction of depression and anxiety.

The visuals and audio of Celeste were praised. The game's pixel art was praised by critics—Ars Technica and Nintendo Life felt that it had a strong amount of variety, and Polygon it made the game's characters and environments look "vibrant and memorable". The art style present in cutsenes was also praised, with Eurogamer calling it "beautifully simple", and Nintendo Life and GameSpot appreciating how it blended together with the pixel art. Nintendo Life further commented that the animations were "fluid and varied", and Rock Paper Shotgun felt that all of Madeline's actions were "exquisitely animated". The soundtrack was praised too, with several critics lauding it as among the best video game soundtracks, and others appreciated how it complimented the gameplay: IGN sait that it added an "amazing amount of life" to each area, and Kotaku said that "Anxiety" in particularly captured "the feeling of true anxiety". Reviewers felt that it remained enjoyable to listen to even after extended periods of time, and certain aspects of the music were praised, such as the synthesizer or piano portions. Critics appreciated the remixes of songs present in the B-side levels too, with Nintendo World Report saying they were "just as magnificent" as the rest of the music.

Reviewing Farewell, Kotaku said that it was "the perfect capstone" and "a wonderful sendoff" to Celeste, and USgamer said that it really felt "like a farewell" to the game. Kotaku praised the chapter's mechanics, saying that they "play with expectations" by "constantly reinvent[ing]" themselves", and that the levels present in Farewell were "some of the finest and most rewarding" challenges in Celeste, and "some of the best designed levels of any game". However, USgamer felt that they were unable to master the jellyfish mechanic, and while they were "not mad", they "just accepted" that they were unabled to complete the chapter due to its difficulty, adding that the base game's B-side and C-side levels similarly caused them to "hit a wall". Farewells music was praised by Kotaku, who said it was "fantastic", and that the world as a whole was "charming".

Fan community
After release, Celeste developed a dedicated fanbase, including an active speedrunning community. Certain Celeste players have created custom levels for the game using mods. According to USgamer, the game's community was "a huge part of Celestes success". Kotaku said that Celeste "attracted an audience that's undeniably queer", and reported that several queer members of the Celeste community felt "empowered" by the game, and that Madeline's character arc felt evocative of the struggles faced by members of the LGBT community. Speedrunning was something actively considered by the game's designers. As a speedrunner himself, Celeste sound designer Kevin Regamey contributed to the game accommodating speedrunning, and noted that the development team wanted to make speedrunning more accessible to casual players. Certain techniques discovered by speedrunners were implemented into the game in updates. According to Thorson, the team wanted to allow the best players to continually discover new tricks that can be used by less skilled players. Mechanics are adjusted to accommodate players who wish to perform advanced techniques, though it is often done subtly to preserve the feeling of "breaking" the game. The development team conversed with members of the community to better accommodate speedrunning in certain updates. Members of the Celeste speedrunning community generally appreciate the involvement of the developers, and have praised how changes to the game do not patch or otherwise prevent techniques used in speedruns. Others feel that the act of speedrunning Celeste ties into the game's themes of perseverance.

Accolades

Upon release, Celeste received several nominations and accolades, including for Game of the Year, from outlets and award shows. IGN nominated Celeste for Game of the Year in its 2018 'Best of' awards. The game was ranked by Polygon as the fifth best game of 2018, and ranked by USgamer as the second best game of 2018. Celeste was Shacknews' Best Indie Game of 2018, and Ars Technica considered it to be the best game overall in 2018.

Legacy
Prior to release, Berry commented that a potential sequel to Celeste was not currently planned, saying that the team "told the story [they] wanted to tell". Before the release of Farewell, Thorson said that the team "really [doesn't] want to make a sequel" to Celeste, adding that the team is unaware how they would be able to "do a sequel justice", and that they are "way more interested in making something new" than revisiting an old creation. In a blog post commemorating the game's fourth anniversary in 2022, Thorson said, "I do not want to make Celeste again and I do not want to be who I was when we made Celeste, again", and that she would like to move forward with future projects.

On Celestes third anniversary on January 26, 2021, a sequel to Celeste Classic, known as Celeste 2: Lani's Trek, was released. Lani's Trek stars a new character, Lani, who makes use of a grappling hook to interact with objects and climb Celeste Mountain. The game was developed in three days by Thorson, Berry, and Raine, and released for PICO-8.

In December 2022, CNET considered Celeste to be among the best games for the Nintendo Switch. Hardcore Gaming 101 included Celeste in a 2020 addendum to their book The 200 Best Video Games of All Time, and USA Today ranked it as the fourteenth best game of all time in 2022.

Notes

References

Works cited

Further reading

External links

 

2018 video games
Game jam video games
Indie video games
Interactive Achievement Award winners
Linux games
MacOS games
Microsoft XNA games
Nintendo Switch games
Platform games
PlayStation 4 games
PlayStation Network games
Retro-style video games
Single-player video games
Transgender-related video games
Video games about mental health
Video games developed in Canada
Video games featuring female protagonists
Video games scored by Lena Raine
Video games set in Canada
Windows games
Xbox Cloud Gaming games
Xbox One games
Stadia games
Video games designed by Maddy Thorson
The Game Awards winners
Independent Games Festival winners
Game Developers Choice Award winners
D.I.C.E. Award for Action Game of the Year winners